SMS Tiger was the third member of the  of gunboats built for the German Kaiserliche Marine (Imperial Navy) in the late 1890s and early 1900s.

Design
She displaced  at full load. Her propulsion system consisted of a pair of horizontal triple-expansion steam engines each driving a single screw propeller, with steam supplied by four coal-fired Thornycroft boilers. She had a crew of 9 officers and 121 enlisted men. Tiger was armed with a main battery of two  SK L/40 guns, with 482 rounds of ammunition. She also carried six machine guns.

Service history

Tiger was laid down at the Kaiserliche Werft (Imperial Shipyard) in Danzig in 1898. She was launched on 15 August 1899 and commissioned into the German fleet on 3 April 1900.

In August 1904, the badly damaged Russian battleship Tsesarevich and three destroyers sought refuge in the German naval base at Tsingtao following the Russian defeat in the Battle of the Yellow Sea. As Germany was neutral, the East Asia Squadron interned Tsesarevich and the destroyers. On 13 August, the Russian ships restocked their coal supplies from three British steamers, but the armored cruiser  and the protected cruiser  cleared for action to prevent them from leaving the port.

Tiger was scuttled on 29 October 1914 at the German colony in the Kiautschou Bay concession during the Siege of Tsingtao. Three of her sisters were also scuttled during the siege.

Notes

References

Further reading

1899 ships
Ships built in Danzig
Iltis-class gunboats
World War I naval ships of Germany
Maritime incidents in September 1914
Scuttled vessels of Germany
World War I shipwrecks in the Pacific Ocean
Shipwrecks of China